La Maison Dieu may refer to:
La Maison-Dieu, a village in France; or
The French name for The Tower, a tarot card.